Buddhism is a minority religion in Argentina, where, in addition to the majority of the Christian population, the rate of self-professed Buddhists is about 0.5%.

Buddhism in Argentina has been practiced since the early 1980s.
Chinese Buddhist immigrants had established their first Buddhist temple in 1986, and Korean Buddhist immigrants also founded their own temple. Since then many groups have been giving teachings, some of them rooted in the best known Sōtō tradition from Japan, but also in many Tibetan institutes for the practice of meditation (Mahamudra, Dzog Chen, Lam Rim).

Nowadays, many Buddhist centres have flourished and propagated widely. In Buenos Aires, it is the home of about 5,000 immigrant Buddhists and 25,000 Buddhist converts.

Many organizations have cooperated to bring the relics of the Buddha to Argentina. This event was supported by the Royal Embassy of Thailand in Buenos Aires.

Among scholars who contributed to the spreading of Buddhism in Argentina are Samuel Wolpin, whose books have opened a door to many students and the general public, and Carmen Dragonetti and Fernando Tola, who have been researching and studying Buddhism for many years, with their books translated to many languages.

Teachers who have visited the country include Pu Hsien, founder of the Tzong Kuan Temple, Mok Sunim, responsible for spreading of Korean Buddhism in the early twenty-first century, Chogyal Namkhai Norbu, founder of the international Dzog Chen Community who transmitted Dzog Chen teachings here, and Lama Ngawang Sherab Dorje, who visited Argentina many times. Local teachers include Augusto Alcalde (Diamond Sangha) the first Roshi in this country. Jorge Bustamante, Soto lineage. Alberto Pulisi (Upasaka). Gonzalo Barreiros (Dharma Teacher), and two Argentine lamas, Horacio and Consuelo.

Japanese Zen Buddhism
There are about seven Japanese Zen Buddhism institutions which has a total of around five thousand practitioners. One of them, Zen Deshimaru Buddhist Association was formed in 1995 and is led by Soto Zen priest, Stephane “Kosen” Thibaut who performed missionary works in Argentina and other Latin American countries. In the mid-1990s, he began visiting Argentina, guiding meditation retreats, and establishing dojos. The organization is the biggest Zen order in the country, established about nineteen dojos across the country and Shobogenji Temple which is situated on Mount Uritorco in Cordoba Province.

Chinese Buddhism 
Tzong Kuan Temple was founded in 1988 by Master Pu Hsien with the support of Buddhist community in Taiwan, the temple is located in the Belgrano area on Montañeses 2175 Street and has a branch temple in Brazil. The current abbot is Master Zhi Han and the temple is also affiliated to Chinese Buddhist Association in Argentina and Bodhiyana Foundation.

Fo Guang Shan Order from Taiwan also has a branch temple, "Templo Budista Fo Guang Shan" in Argentina since 1992, and the temple offered courses in meditation, martial arts, yoga and hosts vegetarian cooking workshops on regular basis.

Theravada Buddhism
There is a Vipassanā meditation community founded by Eduardo Torres Astigueta, it is known as "Vipassana Buenos Aires" and they conduct weekly practices in Palermo and Flores. In 2005, the Argentinean Vipassana Association
acquired a piece of land located in the outskirts of Brandsen in Buenos Aires Province and built the  Dhamma Sukhadā Center which means "Giving the Happiness of Dhamma" with a capacity of 120 students.

See also 
 South America Hongwanji Mission
 Buddhism in Brazil
 Buddhism in Colombia
 Buddhism in Venezuela
 Buddhism in Ecuador
 Buddhism in Costa Rica
 Buddhism in Nicaragua
 Buddhism in Mexico
 Buddhism in Canada
 Buddhism in the United States
 Buddhism in Central America
 Asian Argentines

References

External links 
Buddhist Channel His Holiness Concludes His Argentina Visit
Summary of Religious Bodies in Argentina
Buddhism in Argentina
History of Buddhism in Argentina

 
Religion in Argentina
Argentina
Argentina